"My Egyptian Lover" is the lead single from Space Cowboy's third studio album, Digital Rock (2006). It features British singer Nadia Oh and has been playlisted on BBC Radio 1, Kiss and Galaxy FM, with support from DJ Scott Mills, who made it his "Record of the Week". "My Egyptian Lover" is also included on Oh's debut album, Hot Like Wow. It was released with remixes by the Loose Cannons, Ben Macklin, Paul Jackson, and Rogerseventytwo. The song was also used heavily by the American recording artist Lady Gaga throughout 2008 to promote her singles "Just Dance" and "Poker Face", to which the song's producer partook in the promotion.

Track listing
UK CD single 
"My Egyptian Lover" (Original Radio Edit) – 2:23
"My Egyptian Lover" (Extended Club Mix) – 2:59
"My Egyptian Lover" (Loose Cannons 'Luxorious' Mix) – 6:46
"My Egyptian Lover" (Video) – 2:27

Charts

References

2007 singles
2007 songs
Space Cowboy (musician) songs
Songs about Egypt
Songs written by Space Cowboy (musician)